Buphagium or Bouphagion was a town of ancient Arcadia, in the district Cynuria, situated near the sources of the river Buphagus (Βουφάγος), a tributary of the Alpheius, which formed the boundary between the territories of Heraea and Megalopolis.

Its site is located near the modern Kryo Nero.

References

Populated places in ancient Arcadia
Former populated places in Greece